Theo Bruins (25 November 1929, in Arnhem – 8 January 1993, in Haarlem) was a Dutch pianist and composer.

Life and career
Bruins' earliest piano lessons were with his mother. His professional piano studies commenced in 1946 with Jaap Spaanderman at the Conservatoire of the Amsterdam Muzieklyceum Foundation (merged into the Amsterdam Conservatoire). Starting in 1948 he studied with Yves Nat and from 1951 studied composition with Kees van Baaren.

In the meanwhile he had started a successful career as a performing concert pianist, which took him to North America and South America, and throughout Europe, as well as to Indonesia. Amongst others he played as a soloist with the Concertgebouw Orchestra. For a recital in London he received the Harriet Cohen Beethoven Medal in 1959. He taught at the Royal Conservatoire of The Hague. Among his students are Bart Berman, Maarten Bon, Loek van der Leeden, and Fred Oldenburg.

Bruins' compositions are few in number, but nevertheless well noted. All his works were published by Donemus and collected on one album by the Q Disc label. His Syncope for harpsichord (1992) appears also on a collection by NM Music.

Complete list of works
 Six pièces brèves (1950)
 Concerto per pianoforte ed orchestra (1952)
 Sonate per pianoforte (1955)
 Sei Studi (1963)
 Quartet '84 for piano solo (1984)
 Tremani for two pianos (1991/1992)
 Syncope for harpsichord (1992)

Biography
 Emanuel Overbeeke: Moeizame componeerarbeid (Dutch: Difficult Composition Labor). Mens en Melodie, February 1997.

References

External links
Theo Bruins' page at Donemus

1929 births
1993 deaths
Dutch male classical composers
Dutch classical composers
Dutch classical pianists
People from Arnhem
20th-century classical composers
20th-century classical pianists
Male classical pianists
20th-century Dutch male musicians
Conservatorium van Amsterdam alumni